Adile Hanımsultan ("Justice, fairness"; 12 November 1900 – February 1979) was an Ottoman princess, daughter of Naime Sultan and Kemaleddin Pasha and granddaughter of Sultan Abdülhamid II.

Early life
Adile Hanımsultan was born on 12 November 1900 in the Ortaköy Palace. Her father was Mehmed Kemaleddin Pasha, son of Gazi Osman Pasha and Zatıgül Hanım. Her mother was Naime Sultan, daughter of Sultan Abdul Hamid II and Bidar Kadın. She had an older brother, Sultanzade Mehmed Cahid Osman Bey. She was educated at the Ortaköy Palace.

In 1904, when she was four years old, her parents divorced, due to her father's affair with Hatice Sultan, daughter of Murad V. Her father was stripped of all military honours and ranks and was exiled to Bursa. He came back to Istanbul in 1909 and died in 1920. Her mother afterwards married İşkodralı Celaleddin Pasha in 1907.

Marriages and descendants 
Adile's first husband was Şehzade Mahmud Şevket, son of Şehzade Mehmed Seyfeddin and Nervaliter Hanım, and three years her junior. The marriage took place on 4 May 1922 in the Üsküdar Palace, when Adile was twenty two and Mahmud was nineteen years old. The couple was given Kuruçeşme Palace as their residence. On 27 January 1923, she gave birth to the couple's only child, Hamide Nermin Nezahet Sultan. Nermin has developed bone tuberculosis, which remained throughout her life. 

At the exile of the imperial family in March 1924, Adile and her husband firstly settled in France and then in Egypt. Their daughter Nermin was taken by her grandmother, Naime, who claimed that Adile and Mahmud were too young to look after her. Nermin then grew up with her in Albania. They divorced on 28 March 1928 in Cairo.

In 1930, Adile married Orhan El-Bekri, a wealthy man of Turkish origin. The couple had three children, two daughters and a son, Ayten El-Bekri, Kubilay El-Bekri and Şermin El-Bekri. Her son Kubilay married Gönül Hanım, a woman of Turkish origin. Her daughter Ayten married renowned Egyptian Professor Zekeriya Nasr. Şermin and Ayten both settled in Paris.

Death
In 1952, after the law for princesses was passed, which availed them to return back to Turkey, however Adile did not return and chose to remain in Cairo. She died in February 1979 at the age of seventy-eight in Cairo.

Ancestry

References

Sources
 
 
 

1900 births
1979 deaths
Royalty from Istanbul
20th-century Ottoman princesses